Events from the year 1911 in Canada.

Incumbents

Crown 
 Monarch – George V

Federal government 
 Governor General – Albert Grey, 4th Earl Grey (until October 13) then Prince Arthur, Duke of Connaught and Strathearn 
 Prime Minister – Wilfrid Laurier (until October 6) then Robert Borden (from October 10)
 Chief Justice – Charles Fitzpatrick (Quebec) 
 Parliament – 11th (until 29 July) then 12th (from 15 November)

Provincial governments

Lieutenant governors 
Lieutenant Governor of Alberta – George Hedley Vicars Bulyea 
Lieutenant Governor of British Columbia – Thomas Wilson Paterson  
Lieutenant Governor of Manitoba – Daniel Hunter McMillan (until August 1) then Douglas Colin Cameron  
Lieutenant Governor of New Brunswick – Lemuel John Tweedie 
Lieutenant Governor of Nova Scotia – James Drummond McGregor
Lieutenant Governor of Ontario – John Morison Gibson  
Lieutenant Governor of Prince Edward Island – Benjamin Rogers 
Lieutenant Governor of Quebec – Charles Alphonse Pantaléon Pelletier (until May 5) then François Langelier
Lieutenant Governor of Saskatchewan – George William Brown

Premiers 
Premier of Alberta – Arthur Sifton
Premier of British Columbia – Richard McBride  
Premier of Manitoba – Rodmond Roblin  
Premier of New Brunswick – John Douglas Hazen (until October 16) then James Kidd Flemming
Premier of Nova Scotia – George Henry Murray 
Premier of Ontario – James Whitney
Premier of Prince Edward Island – Francis Haszard (until May 16) then Herbert James Palmer (May 16 to December 2) then John Mathieson  
Premier of Quebec – Lomer Gouin  
Premier of Saskatchewan – Thomas Walter Scott

Territorial governments

Commissioners
 Commissioner of Yukon – Alexander Henderson (until June 1) then Arthur Wilson (acting)
 Gold Commissioner of Yukon – F.X. Gosselin 
 Commissioner of Northwest Territories – Frederick D. White

Events
 May 16 – James Palmer becomes Premier of Prince Edward Island, replacing F. L. Haszard
 June 14 – Nova Scotia election: George Henry Murray's Liberals win a second consecutive majority
 September 21 – Federal election: Robert Borden's Conservatives win a majority, defeating Sir Wilfrid Laurier's Liberals
 October 4 – John Young Monument unveiled
 October 10 – Robert Borden becomes prime minister, replacing Sir Wilfrid Laurier
 October 16 – James Flemming becomes Premier of New Brunswick, replacing Sir John Hazen
 December 2 – John Mathieson becomes premier of Prince Edward Island, replacing James Palmer
 December 11 – Ontario election: Sir James Whitney's Conservatives win a third consecutive majority

Sport 

November 25 –  University of Toronto Varsity Blues defeated the Toronto Argonauts 14 to 7 in the 3rd Grey Cup played at Toronto's Varsity Stadium

Full date unknown
 Association of Universities and Colleges of Canada is founded.
 Dominion Parks Branch is established, the world's first national park service, now called Parks Canada.

Arts and literature
Popular artworks

 Autumn In France by Emily Carr.

Births

Unknown date
Stuart Trueman, journalist and writer

January to June
 January 3 – Jean Bourcier, ice hockey player
 January 27 – Blanche Meagher, diplomat
 February 3 – Robert Charboneau, writer
 March 12 – Stanley Bréhaut Ryerson, historian, educator and political activist (d.1998)
 April 22 – Alexander Bell Patterson, politician (d.1993)
 April 29 – Andrew Hill Clark, geographer
 May 11 – William Cecil Ross, politician (d.1998)
 May 11 – Mitchell Sharp, politician and Minister (d.2004)
 June 24 – Portia White, singer (d.1968)
 June 28 – Czeslaw Brzozowicz, engineer (d.1997)

July to December
 July 18 – Hume Cronyn, actor (d.2003)
 July 21 – Marshall McLuhan, educator, philosopher, and scholar (d.1980)
 August 5 – Albert Sanschagrin, Bishop of Saint-Hyacinthe, Quebec (d.2009)
 August 28 – Nérée Arsenault, politician

Deaths
 March 11 – Théotime Blanchard, farmer, merchant and politician (b.1844)
 April 14 – Henri Elzéar Taschereau, jurist and 4th Chief Justice of Canada (b.1836)
 April 29 – Charles Alphonse Pantaléon Pelletier, lawyer, militia officer, politician, publisher, judge, and the 9th Lieutenant Governor of Quebec (b.1837)
 November 6 – John Carling, businessman and politician (b.1828)
 December 12 – Daniel J. Greene, politician and Prime Minister of Newfoundland (b.1850)

Historical documents
With "unenviable record for deaths," residential school principal blames drafty building and its "sanitary and heating appliances"

Henri Bourassa denounces prejudiced attacks on French Canadian nationalism

Order in Council cancels previous order prohibiting entry for one year of "any immigrant belonging to the Negro race"

Cartoon: anti-reciprocity depiction of Johnny Canuck and Uncle Sam cutting up watermelon (Note: racial stereotypes and blackface)

Saskatchewan premier and farmers disappointed federal election has ruled out reciprocity with U.S.A.

Poster recruits U.S. men to harvest 100,000,000 bushels of Canadian grain

Nellie McClung speaks on importance of social life in rural areas

Fruit co-operative manager says co-ops would do better if farmers valued business methods more and self-reliance less

British woman fired from first au pair job on her undercover investigation of domestic work in Manitoba

U.S. reporter explains how church-going, law-abiding Canadians had no Wild West

U.S. reporter calls Quebec City economic backwater with fine sightseeing

Ancient farms and conservative rural ways on St. Lawrence River near Quebec City

Terrible fire does not discourage exploitation of immense mineral wealth in Timmins area of northern Ontario

Great healing powers (and products) found in Manitou Lake, near Watrous, Saskatchewan

Mackenzie King falls for his ideal woman

References 

 
Years of the 20th century in Canada
Canada
Canada